Deyr ü Rahba listed as a district of the Abbasid province of Diyar Bakr, the Arabic name means the land of the Priests (geographically Syriac Priests), the name remained in use for a Kurdish chiefdom until 1626 when the whole district was transferred to Eyalet Raqqa.

References

Kurdish dynasties
Former Kurdish states